Cheatham is a surname. Notable people with the surname include:

Benjamin F. Cheatham (1820–1886), Confederate general and California gold miner
Boyd M. Cheatham (c. 1838-1876), Tennessee state congressman
Charles Cheatham Cavanah (1871–1953), United States federal judge
Dave Cheatham, Democratic member, Indiana House of Representatives (representing 69th District since 2006)
Doc Cheatham (1905–1997), American jazz trumpeter, singer and bandleader
Donna Cheatham, the winningest coach in Indiana girls' high school basketball history
Edward Saunders Cheatham (1818-1878), Tennessee state congressman and senator.
Eugene Calvin Cheatham Jr. (1915–2005), one of the Tuskegee Airmen and a career officer
Henry P. Cheatham (1857–1935), African American Republican member, US House of Representatives
Jack Cheatham (1894 – 1971), American character actor 
Jimmy Cheatham (1924–2007), American jazz trombonist and teacher
John Cheatham (1855–1918), American firefighter
Karla Cheatham Mosley (born 1981), American actress 
Kitty Cheatham (1864–1946), American singer and actress
 Kwan Cheatham (born 1995), American basketball player for Ironi Nes Ziona of the Israel Basketball Premier League
Maree Cheatham (born 1942), American actress
Oliver Cheatham (1948–2013), American singer
Owen Robertson Cheatham (1902-1970), American founder of Georgia-Pacific
Richard Boone Cheatham (1824–1877), mayor of Nashville, Tennessee during the opening years of the Civil War
Richard Cheatham (1799–1845), American politician who represented Tennessee 's eleventh district
Teresa Cheatham (born 1957), vocal instructor from Wellington, Alabama who was named Miss Alabama 1978

See also
 Chetham
 Cheetham (surname)
 Chitham (surname)

English-language surnames